The 2018 Asia Cup (also known as Unimoni Asia Cup for sponsorship reasons) was a One-Day International (ODI) cricket tournament that was held in the United Arab Emirates in September 2018. It was the 14th edition of the Asia Cup and the third time the tournament was played in the United Arab Emirates, after the 1984 and 1995 tournaments. India were the defending champions, and retained their title, after beating Bangladesh by three wickets in the final.

The five full members of the Asian Cricket Council took part in the tournament: Afghanistan, Bangladesh, India, Pakistan and Sri Lanka. They were joined by Hong Kong, who won the 2018 Asia Cup Qualifier tournament. Hong Kong had lost their ODI status after finishing tenth in the 2018 Cricket World Cup Qualifier in March. However, on 9 September 2018, the International Cricket Council (ICC) awarded ODI status to all matches in the tournament.

Background
Originally, the tournament was scheduled to be played in India. It was moved to the United Arab Emirates, following ongoing political tensions between India and Pakistan.

On 29 October 2015, following the Asian Cricket Council (ACC) meeting in Singapore, the Board of Control for Cricket in India (BCCI) secretary stated that the 2018 edition of the tournament would be held in India. In August 2017, the BCCI sought government clearance to host the tournament, after the 2017 ACC Under-19 Asia Cup was moved to Malaysia. In April 2018, Mohammed bin Zayed Al Nahyan, the Crown Prince of Abu Dhabi, asked if the BCCI and ACC would consider hosting the tournament in Abu Dhabi, in a bid to ensure Pakistan's participation.

Pakistan were scheduled to host the 2018 ACC Emerging Teams Asia Cup ahead of the tournament in April. With the announcement that the Asia Cup would be played in the United Arab Emirates, the Emerging Teams Asia Cup was moved to December 2018, with Sri Lanka co-hosting the tournament with Pakistan.

Format
The schedule and format of the tournament was announced on 24 July 2018, with the six teams split into two groups of three. The top two teams from each of the groups progressed to the Super Four section of the tournament. From there, the top two teams of the Super Four section played each other in the final. Initially, the team that finishes second in Group A were scheduled to play their first Super Four game in Abu Dhabi. However, India would be based in Dubai, irrespective of where they finish in the pool. On 19 September 2018, the Asian Cricket Council (ACC) revised the schedule for the Super Four section The captains of Bangladesh and Pakistan were both critical of the ACC's new schedule.

Teams
 , ICC Full Member
 , ICC Full Member
 , ICC Full Member
 , ICC Full Member
 , ICC Full Member
 , 2018 Asia Cup Qualifier

Squads

Before the start of the tournament, Wafadar Momand was ruled out of Afghanistan's squad due to injury and was replaced by Yamin Ahmadzai, and Mominul Haque was added to Bangladesh's squad. Dinesh Chandimal and Danushka Gunathilaka were ruled out of Sri Lanka's squad due to injury. They were replaced by Niroshan Dickwella and Shehan Jayasuriya respectively. Bangladesh's Tamim Iqbal suffered a wrist injury in the opening match and was ruled out of the rest of the tournament.

After the conclusion of the India-Pakistan match in the group stage, Hardik Pandya, Axar Patel and Shardul Thakur were all ruled out of India's squad for the rest of the tournament due to injuries. They were replaced by Ravindra Jadeja, Deepak Chahar and Siddarth Kaul. At the Super Four stage of the tournament, Soumya Sarkar and Imrul Kayes were added to Bangladesh's squad. Shakib Al Hasan was ruled out of Bangladesh's final Super Four match, and the rest of the tournament, due to an injury he initially sustained in January 2018, during the final of the Bangladesh Tri-Nation Series.

Match officials
The ICC appointed the following umpires and match referees for all thirteen matches. Six match officiating umpires were from participating countries of the Asia Cup who are the members of ICC International Panel of Umpires, four umpires were from neutral countries, while the remaining two umpires belonged to the Elite Panel of ICC Umpires.

 Match Referees
  David Boon
  Andy Pycroft

 Umpires from participating nations
  Ahmed Shah Pakteen
  Anisur Rahman
  Anil Chaudhary
  Nitin Menon
  Chettithody Shamshuddin
  Ahsan Raza
  Ruchira Palliyaguruge

 Umpires from neutral countries
  Rod Tucker
  Marais Erasmus
  Shaun George
  Gregory Brathwaite

Venues

Group stage
Bangladesh faced Sri Lanka in the opening game of the tournament at the Dubai International Cricket Stadium. It was Bangladesh's first match in the United Arab Emirates since April 1995, when they faced Pakistan in the 1995 Asia Cup.

In Group B, Sri Lanka were eliminated from the tournament, after losing both of their matches. Therefore Afghanistan and Bangladesh progressed to the Super Four section of the competition. In Group A, Hong Kong also lost both of their matches, meaning that India and Pakistan progressed to the Super Fours.

Group A

Group B

Super Four
In the penultimate round of Super Four matches, India beat Pakistan by nine wickets and Bangladesh beat Afghanistan by three runs. Therefore, India progressed to the final of the tournament and Afghanistan were eliminated. In the final Super Four match, Bangladesh beat Pakistan by 37 runs to advance to the final.

In India's last Super Four match, against Afghanistan, captain Rohit Sharma and vice-captain Shikhar Dhawan were both rested for the match. MS Dhoni was named captain of the side in their absence, and became the first cricketer to lead India 200 times in ODIs. Dhoni became the oldest player to lead India in an ODI. The match finished in a tie, the first time this had occurred in the Asia Cup. It was also the first time that Afghanistan were involved in a tied game in ODIs.

Final

Statistics

Most runs

Most wickets

References

External links
 Series home at ESPN Cricinfo

Asia Cup
International cricket competitions in the United Arab Emirates
2018 in Emirati cricket
International cricket competitions in 2018–19
Asia Cup